Wolfgang Jöchl (15 October 1930 – 10 May 1981) was an Austrian ice hockey player. He competed in the men's tournament at the 1956 Winter Olympics.

References

External links
 

1930 births
1981 deaths
Olympic ice hockey players of Austria
Ice hockey players at the 1956 Winter Olympics
People from Kitzbühel
Sportspeople from Tyrol (state)